Anne Minter was the defending champion but lost in the quarter-finals to Natalia Bykova.

Monique Javer won in the final 7–6, 6–3 against Leila Meskhi.

Seeds
A champion seed is indicated in bold text while text in italics indicates the round in which that seed was eliminated.

  Natasha Zvereva (first round)
  Anne Minter (quarterfinals)
  Dianne Balestrat (semifinals)
  Leila Meskhi (final)
  Gigi Fernández (second round)
  Robin White (second round)
  Barbara Gerken (second round)
  Svetlana Parkhomenko (first round)

Draw

External links
 ITF tournament draws

Singapore singles
WTA Singapore Open
1988 in Singaporean sport
Women's sports competitions in Singapore